Test tube baby may refer to:

A baby conceived through in vitro fertilisation

Other uses include:
The TV programme Brainiac's Test Tube Baby
Test Tube Babies (film), the 1948 film